Sunshine Week is a national initiative spearheaded by the News Leaders Association to educate the public about the importance of open government and the dangers of excessive and unnecessary secrecy. It was established in March 2005 by the American Society of News Editors, now known as the News Leaders Association, with funding from the John S. and James L. Knight Foundation.

Overview 

Sunshine Week occurs each year in mid-March, coinciding with James Madison's birthday and National Freedom of Information Day on the 16th.

During Sunshine Week, hundreds of media organizations, civic groups, libraries, nonprofits, schools and other participants engage public discussion on the importance of open government through news and feature articles and opinion columns; special Web pages and blogs; infographics; editorial cartoons; public service advertising; public seminars and forums. The purpose of the week is to highlight the fact that "government functions best when it operates in the open." In many states, however, legislatures exempt themselves from public-records laws, claiming "legislative immunity."

History

The Florida Society of Newspaper Editors launched Sunshine Sunday in 2002 in response to efforts by some Florida legislators to create scores of new exemptions to the state's public records law. The following year, the idea of a national Sunshine Sunday was raised at an ASNE Freedom of Information summit.

In the planning stages, it was decided that the initiative needed to be more than a single Sunday, and Sunshine Week was born.

The first nationwide Sunshine Week took place March 13–19, 2005.

See also
Freedom of information legislation
Electronic Frontier Foundation
Personally identifiable information (PII)
Privacy laws of the United States
Public Record Office
Public records
General Register Office

References

External links
Sunshine Week
National Freedom of Information (FOI) Day
American Library Association page for: Freedom of Information Day
Guides to Public Records from UCB Libraries GovPubs
Publications from the U.S. Government from USA.gov
The Center for Public Integrity
It Took a FOIA Lawsuit to Uncover How the Obama Administration Killed FOIA Reform, Vice News
Microsoft: Government Public Records Tracker from Eskel Porter Consulting
Media coalition sues McCrory administration over records, WRAL
Delay game: The McCrory administration drags its feet on our public records lawsuit, IndyWeek

March observances
Awareness weeks in the United States
2005 establishments in the United States